Yosef Yozpa Sofer 1819–1883
()
() was the third son of Rabbi Moshe Sofer (Chassam Sofer) of Pressburg, brother of Rabbi Samuel Benjamin Sofer and Rabbi Shimon Sofer.

Life
Yosef Yozpa was born in 1819 in the city of Pressburg, Hungary, where his father was serving as Chief Rabbi. His mother Sarel (1790–1832), was the daughter of Rabbi Akiva Eger, Rav of Poznań. She was the widow of Rabbi Avraham Moshe Kalischer (1788–1812), Rabbi of Piła.

He married Sarel the daughter of Elchanan from the village Šúrovce. They lived in Šúrovce where Yosef Yozpa was a merchant. Together they had three children, Moshe, Akiva and Raizel. Raizel married the famed Rabbi Yehuda Greenwald (1845–1920).

Death
In 1883, Yosef Yozpa was ambushed and killed in an open field whilst riding to Hlohovec (Hungarian Galgóc) by a debt ower. His wagon driver escaped the incident. With no driver reining, the horses instinctly returned to his home in Šúrovce carrying the dying Yosef Yozpa in the carriage. He was found dead upon arrival. He was buried in Šúrovce.

After this incident, his wife moved to the city of Szatmárnémeti (Satmar) where she lived to her last day aside her daughter and son in law. She is buried in the Jewish cemetery there.

References

1819 births
1883 deaths
Austro-Hungarian Jews
Businesspeople from Bratislava